Her Boy is a 1915 British silent drama film directed by Frank Wilson and starring Stewart Rome, Violet Hopson and Lionelle Howard.

Plot
A reckless gambler loses both his mother and his wife's money.

Cast
 Stewart Rome as Hugh Vane  
 Violet Hopson as Nance  
 Lionelle Howard as Eric  
 Chrissie White as Isabelle

References

Bibliography
 Palmer, Scott. British Film Actors' Credits, 1895-1987. McFarland, 1988.

External links

1915 films
1915 drama films
British drama films
British silent feature films
1910s English-language films
Films directed by Frank Wilson
Films set in England
Hepworth Pictures films
British black-and-white films
1910s British films
Silent drama films